The 1939 football season was São Paulo's 10th season since the club's founding in 1930.

Overall

{|class="wikitable"
|-
|Games played || 36 (20 Campeonato Paulista, 16 Friendly match)
|-
|Games won || 20 (10 Campeonato Paulista, 10 Friendly match)
|-
|Games drawn || 3 (1 Campeonato Paulista, 2 Friendly match)
|-
|Games lost || 13 (9 Campeonato Paulista, 4 Friendly match)
|-
|Goals scored || 73
|-
|Goals conceded || 44
|-
|Goal difference || +29
|-
|Best result || 8–1 (H) v Portuguesa Santista - Campeonato Paulista - 1939.11.12
|-
|Worst result || 0–3 (A) v Corinthians - Friendly match - 1939.12.03
|-
|Most appearances || 
|-
|Top scorer || 
|-

Friendlies

Official competitions

Campeonato Paulista

Record

External links
official website 

Association football clubs 1939 season
1939
1939 in Brazilian football